Sánchez, Dominican Republic is a Dominican municipality in the Samaná province, on the south coast of the peninsula of Samaná.

History
The old town of Las Cañitas was elevated to the category of municipality in 1866 with the name of Francisco del Rosario Sánchez, one of the three Founding Fathers of the Dominican Republic.

It was a very small town but it grew in importance and population when the railway from town to La Vega (in La Vega Province) began to run across the rich region of the Cibao. Sánchez became the most important port of the country during the rest of the 19th century and beginning of the 20th century. The railway worked until 1966.

The port has lost its importance because when other ports in the country grew in importance, Sánchez lost its importance as a port. And the Yuna River has been filling the Samaná Bay with solid material and only small boats can get to the port.

Climate

Economy
The main economic activity of the municipality is agriculture. Fishing was the main activity but now is not so important.

References

Populated places in Samaná Province
Municipalities of the Dominican Republic